Converting Vegetarians II is the ninth studio album by Israeli psychedelic trance duo Infected Mushroom. It was released on September 11, 2015 on Dim Mak Records. It is a sequel to the band's 2003 album Converting Vegetarians.

Track listing
"She Zoremet" – 5:14
"Yamakas in Space" – 7:33
"Sense of Direction" – 3:25
"Animatronica" – 6:15
"Feelings" – 4:10
"Pink Froid" – 7:40
"Demons of Pain" – 2:58
"Zoan Zound" – 4:31
"Blue Swan 5" – 8:58
"Fields of Grey (feat. Sasha Grey)" – 4:18
"Leopold" – 4:14
"On the Road Again" – 3:59
"Stuck in a Loop" – 4:23
"Mexicali" – 3:45
"The Surgeon" – 6:21

Charts

References

2015 albums
Infected Mushroom albums